Madness in Manila: Shadows Fall Live in the Philippines 2009, commonly referred to as simply Madness in Manila, is the second concert DVD by American thrash metal band Shadows Fall and was released on October 26, 2010 via Everblack Industries/Ferret Music. The disc included footage that was shot on April 30, 2009 at the Pulp Summer Slam in Manila, Philippines.

The performance features songs from every studio album the band had released at that point, except for the debut Somber Eyes to the Sky.

Track listing

Personnel
Brian Fair - lead vocals
Jonathan Donais - lead guitar, backing vocals
Matthew Bachand - rhythm guitar, clean vocals
Paul Romanko - bass
Jason Bittner - drums

References

2010 video albums
Shadows Fall video albums
2010 live albums
Live video albums